Cordeaux is a suburb of the City of Wollongong, New South Wales, Australia.

Heritage listings 
Cordeaux has heritage-listed sites including:

 Cordeaux Dam

References

External links

Suburbs of Wollongong
City of Wollongong